Nayak (also released under the translated title The Hero, and as Nayak: The Hero) is a 1966 Indian Bengali-language drama film composed, written, and directed by Satyajit Ray. It was Ray's second entirely original screenplay, after Kanchenjungha (1962). The story revolves around a matinee idol on a 24-hour train journey from Kolkata to Delhi to receive a national award. However, he ends up revealing his mistakes, insecurities and regrets to a young journalist, who realises that behind all his arrogant facade lies a deeply troubled man as his life's story is gradually revealed through seven flashbacks and two dreams. The film starring Uttam Kumar in main protagonist and Sharmila Tagore played second lead.

In Nayak, Uttam Kumar plays Arindam Mukherjee with such poise and ease that it appears as if he is portraying his own life on the celluloid. Ray gives us a vulnerable hero hiding behind his cocky, larger-than-life façade. And, Kumar, to his credit, never misses a note during his challenging portrayal. He is well complemented by Sharmila Tagore who plays the character of Aditi to a tee. Aditi is the only person Arindam opens up to; the tantalizing conversations between the two characters offer some great food for thought. Ray uses the various interactions between the co-passengers to make us realize that the hypocrisies and follies of a star are not much different from that of an ordinary man. A few other characters in the movie merely provide a morality check.

Satyajit Ray often used to say that he did not like making grand films, and that he would rather tell the story of the ordinary man, the man on the street. Like his films, his short stories too mirrored this preference of his – most of them describing the lives of ordinary men – all of whom were, without exception, very lonely. Why, then, did Ray decide to make Nayak (The Hero) – a film on the life of an insanely popular matinee idol, a brash, haughty young superstar riding the waves of popularity and enjoying it to the hilt? The answer is hidden in the many layers of the film itself – a film that is so rich, so deep and yet, told in such simple language that perhaps it would not be a mistake to claim that it featured among the best works of Satyajit Ray’s illustrious career.

Plot
The plot of the film has to some extent been inspired by Wild Strawberries of Ingmar Bergman. A famous actor of Bengali films, Arindam Mukherjee (Uttam Kumar), is invited to the capital, Delhi to receive a prestigious award. He travels by the train. The morning newspaper arrives and carries with it an article on an altercation he had been involved in. In the restaurant car, he meets Aditi Sengupta (Sharmila Tagore), a young journalist who edits a modern women's magazine, Adhunika. Filled with contempt for the likes of him, she secretly plans to interview him because she thinks it would attract more readers. He soon starts to reveal his personality, and also brings to surface the inner insecurities and his consciousness of the limitations of his 'powers'. Aditi initially takes notes, surreptitiously, but later on, out of empathy almost bordering on pity, stops. However, critical of the star, she interrogates him, leading to further introspection on his part. Slowly, his guilt about the way things turned out is very visible.

Arindam also mentions Shankar-da, his mentor, who had never wanted Arindam to join films, being a strong opposer of the medium. He talks about his first day in film, and on the different experiences he faced with other workers in the field and some of the things that happened to them.

Toward the end of the train journey, Arindam is drunk and feels a need to confide his wrongdoings. He asks the conductor to fetch Aditi. He begins to reveal the reason behind the altercation he was a part of, but Aditi stops him, as she has already guessed. It was an affair he'd had with one of his co-actors, Promila. Afraid that he might commit suicide, Aditi makes sure he returns to his cubicle, before going back to her own.

As the star re-lives and examines his life with Aditi, a bond develops between them. Aditi realizes that in spite of his fame and success, Arindam is a lonely man, in need of empathy. Out of respect for him, she chooses to suppress the story and tears up the notes she has written. She lets the hero preserve his public image.

Cast

Uttam Kumar - Arindam Mukherjee
Sharmila Tagore - Aditi Sengupta
Bireswar Sen - Mukunda Lahiri
Soumen Bose - Shankar
Nirmal Ghosh - Jyoti
Premangshu Bose - Biresh
Jogesh Chatterjee - Aghore Chattopadhyay
Sumita Sanyal - Promila Chatterjee
Ranjit Sen - Haren Bose
Bharati Devi - Manorama (Mr. Bose's wife)
Lali Chowdhury - Bulbul (Mr. Bose's daughter)
Kamu Mukherjee - Pritish Sarkar
Susmita Mukherjee - Molly (Mr. Sarkar's wife)
Subrata Sensharma - Ajoy
Jamuna Sinha - Sefalika (Ajoy's wife)
Satya Banerjee - Swami of WWWW organisation
Hiralal - Kamal Misra

Soundtrack

Production

Development
This is Satyajit Ray's second original screenplay after Kanchunjungha 1962 which he wrote. Ray wrote the screenplay of the film at Darjeeling in May, where he went during off-season from filming. Even then he had Uttam Kumar in his mind for the lead, but not as an actor, rather a "phenomenon". When Ray finished this script he hearing to Tapan Sinha and said ''I would choice to Uttam for this role''. Then Sinha replied This is perfect choice. No other can play than Uttam to this role. In a letter by Ray in 1966, he wrote:

Casting
Uttam Kumar is the automatic choice for the Arindam role since Ray scripting. But At first Ray selected Madhabi Mukherjee for the Aditi role. But Madhabi rejected that offer for some personal reasons. Later Ray didn't get any artists to matched for the Aditi role then he selected Sharmila Tagore, That time Tagore was busy in hindi films. According to Ray's son Sandip Ray Sharmila was dating with Tiger Pataudi that time. Tiger also came to see the shooting. Ray become very happy to heard that they will marry. There is also Bharati Devi and others well known artists played the supporting role. Soumitra Chatterjee who was regular actor of Ray was also want to do this role of Arindam. But Ray rejected and said him Are you Uttam

Development
The film was shot in the latter half of 1965. Some critics says that it's loosely inspired from Ingmer Bargman Wild Strawberries. Many people thought generally  that the film shooted in train. But originally the film shooted in NT Studio (New Theaters) 1 and 2 both. The cinematographer Banshi Chandra Gupta personally visited in Santragachi junction to see train comperment making. Later he bring train making parts and build up a luxurious Rajdhani Express in studio and the outside train sequences, shots and sound are taken from original train journey from Kolkata to Delhi when Banshi himself captured that totally. The film shooted also in Howrah Station and that tea drinking scenes in station of Uttam are taken from Khanyan station. In this same scenes Sharmila shots are taken from studio. Totally this gave to audience a real fillings. That's is the brilliance of Bansi. 

Before the shooting of Nayak Uttam suffered in chicken pox. So there was a black spots on his check. The first day of shoot Ray told Uttam to shoot without makeup Uttam generally shocked. He suggests to Ray that he had a pox spot so to give the permissions of makeup but Ray reassured him, saying he would give him some make up during the later stages shooting. 

In one scenario, it is better to take the pen out of the pocket and sign. The pen had run out of ink. Satyajit went to say cut, then Uttam tried to sign again with a light shake. Even though it didn't work, he dipped the pen in the glass of water in front of him and signed. Satyajit was very happy to see this scene. This show Uttam's geniusness.

Sharmila tagore stylish modern glass was famous at that time in women's society. When she asked to Ray that Are this Glass is short sight or long sight. Ray was shocked then

Ray was known for his perfection. So in Nayak he rejected 100 shaving brush before to not matched to his mind and then selected one for Uttam.

Released & Reception
The film premiered in Indira Cinema hall. Satyajit Ray invited Uttam Kumar to attend the premiere. When Uttam Kumar arrived in Indira Hall, there were thousands of people gathered to see him and police was employed to handle the situation. The film released on 6th may 1966 in India and Berlin Film Festivals and received overwhelming appreciation from the critics. It was released in the USA in 1974.

This was the first time when the two icons of Bengali Cinema Satyajit Ray and Uttam Kumar worked together. Uttam Kumar once said that it was one of the best films of his career. When the famous Hollywood star Elizabeth Taylor saw Nayak in London she become impressed with Uttam's outstanding performance and screen presence in the film. This film gave Uttam international recognition. The film become an all time blockbuster at the box office.

Ray wrote after Uttam's death ‘I hardly recall any discussion with Uttam on a serious analytical level on the character he was playing. And yet he constantly surprised and delighted me with unexpected little details of action and behaviour which came from him and not from me, which were always in character and always enhanced a scene. They were so spontaneous that it seemed he produced these out of his sleeve. If there was any cogitation involved, he never spoke about it.’ He also said that in this film he might have made some mistakes but Uttam never made any, every shot was confirmed in one take.

For his performance in Nayak, Uttam Kumar was included in Forbes India's 25 greatest acting performances of all time.

After being digitally restored in Academy Film Archive ''Nayak'' was re released in 2014 Berlin Film Festivals. The film got success again.

Awards
Special Jury Award, Berlin International Film Festival, 1966
Critics' Prize (UNICRIT Award), Berlin International Film Festival, 1966
1967: National Film Award for Best Feature Film in Bengali
1967: Bodil Award for Best Non European Film 
1967: BFJA for Best Director Award - Satyajit Ray
1967: BFJA for Best Actor Award - Uttam Kumar

Nominations
Golden Bear for Best Film, Berlin International Film Festival, 1966

Preservation and restoration
The film is one of four Ray films which were digitally restored and set for a re-release in January 2014.

The Academy Film Archive preserved Nayak in 2004.

Legacy
In 2010 a iconic bengali film Autograph was made to tribute to Nayak made by the famous National Award winner director Srijit Mukherjee. That film create a new history in Bengali cinema and won the record 41 awards. That was the first film of Srijt.

References

External links
Nayak (SatyajitRay.org)

The Hero: Depths and Surfaces an essay by Pico Iyer at the Criterion Collection

1966 films
Films directed by Satyajit Ray
Bengali-language Indian films
1960s psychological drama films
Indian black-and-white films
Films about actors
Films set on trains
Indian psychological drama films
Films with screenplays by Satyajit Ray
1960s Bengali-language films
1966 drama films